Oleg Anatolyevich Korneev (born 25 July 1969) is a Russian-born chess player, who now represents Spain. He was awarded the Grandmaster title in 1995.

Chess career
Korneev was not a child prodigy; he finished in the lower half of the 1987 Moscow Central Chess Club Championship at the age of 18, and his first published FIDE rating  in January 1988 was 2280.

In 2004, Korneev tied for 1st–6th with Evgeniy Najer, Artyom Timofeev, Kaido Külaots, Sergey Grigoriants and Zoltan Gyimesi in the Cappelle-la-Grande Open. In 2013 he tied for 1st–11th with Pavel Eljanov, Dmitry Kokarev, Alexander Areshchenko, Denis Khismatullin, Maxim Matlakov, Dragan Šolak, Vadim Zvjaginsev, Sanan Sjugirov, Ivan Bukavshin and Ildar Khairullin in the Chigorin Memorial in St Petersburg.

References

Russian chess players
Spanish chess players
Chess grandmasters
1969 births
Living people